The Houston Mayoral Election of 1991 took place on November 5, 1991. The race was officially non-partisan. Bob Lanier defeated five term incumbent mayor Kathy Whitmire. A run-off election was held on December 7, 1991.

Most white voters of all economic levels voted for Lanier. His strongest tallies came from affluent neighborhoods like River Oaks, Meyerland, Uptown, Memorial and Sharpstown; in those areas he won with 60 to 65 percent or more of the vote. Lanier won 75 percent of the votes in his home Houston precinct. In racially mixed areas such as Westbury and Alief, Lanier had the majority of votes with his main opponent, Sylvester Turner, having finished in a close second place. Lanier did not win in Montrose and many African-American neighborhoods.

Candidates

Incumbent Mayor Kathy Whitmire
Businessman and real estate developer Bob Lanier
State Representative Sylvester Turner

Results

Turner would later campaign in 2003 but took third place. He won the mayoral runoff on December 12, 2015.

References

1991 in Houston
1991 Texas elections
Houston
1991
Non-partisan elections